Elizabeth Nichols Dyar (1751-June 4, 1818) was a New England woman living during the American Revolution, who was married to patriot and war hero Joseph Dyar. She is best known for her role in the Boston Tea Party, in which she along two other women, mixed and applied paint to the men in order to disguise them as Mohawk Indians.

Family life 
Elizabeth Nichols Dyar was born in 1751 in Malden, Massachusetts. On May 2, 1771, at the age of twenty Elizabeth married Joseph Dyar. Joseph was born in England in 1747. In his youth he came to the American Colonies and became a sea captain, sailing from Boston in the foreign trade industry. The pair went on to have seven children: Joseph 1st, who died in infancy; Joseph 2nd; James; Elizabeth; John Nichols; Ebenezer, and Sally. Their son John Nichols Dyar, born in Malden, MA, became the first settler in the town of Freeman, ME

Role in the Revolutionary War 

In 1763 The Dyars lived in a neighborhood in Boston's North End, and were active and respected members of the community. Elizabeth's husband Joseph Dyar was a member of the revolutionary organization Sons of Liberty, a group whose goal was to advance the rights of the European colonists and to fight taxation by the British government. The turning point that got Elizabeth involved in the fight against the British was the Tea Act. Like most women of her time Dyar was an active tea drinker who stated tea is "the cup that cheers but not inebriates." For Elizabeth the Tea Act was the final push, she joined her husband in the protest against the British Government.

On December 16, 1773, Joseph Dyar and other members of Sons of Liberty gathered in the kitchen of the Dyars home where the 22 year old Elizabeth and two other Daughters of Liberty prepared and applied stains and paint to the faces and bodies of the men to transform them into Mohawk Indians. After the men boarded ships in Boston Harbor and destroyed an entire shipment of tea sent by the East India Company.

Before Joseph left on that fateful night, Elizabeth had one request:  that he bring her a handful of tea.  When he returned home he produced the handful of tea and dashed it into the fire.  He raged that not even she would partake of the tea."

Following the Boston Tea Party, the British occupied the city of Boston. Friends and family members of the Dyars feared for their safety during this time, since they believed that if their involvement in the Tea Party was found out, their lives could be endangered. So in order to protect her children, Elizabeth with the help of friends was able to smuggle herself and her children across British lines in an butcher cart, to safety to stay at her childhood home in Malden, Massachusetts.

While Elizabeth focused on taking care of her family during the following years leading up to and during the war, Joseph engaged in the war by smuggling supplies for the American Army across the colonies. Joseph was captured a total nine times by the British during the course of the war. The last time being stripped, flogged, and deprived of food for three days. In his weakened condition he died in 1783 from the effects of his capture. His body was returned to his family and buried in Malden.

After the Revolution 

Following the end of war and the death of her husband, Elizabeth moved to Maine (which was a territory of Massachusetts at the time) with her son John, his wife, and family. John bought 600 acre tract of land in Freeman, ME. Where he built a large colonial mansion sized home, called "Prospect Farm". At the Farm Elizabeth lived out the rest of her life till her death on June 4, 1818.

Remembrance 

Her role in helping to boycott the Tea Act has made her a popular figure in the women's organization the Daughters of the American Revolution. In which several chapters around the country are named after Dyar. In the September 1923 the Colonel Asa Whitcomb Chapter of the DAR in Kingfield, Maine, made a formal memorial in her honor. The Tablet reads on her memorial:
TO COMMEMORATE THE PATRIOTISM OF

ELIZABETH NICHOLS DYAR

ONE OF THREE YOUNG WOMEN
WHO MIXED AND APPLIED THE PAINT
TO DISGUISE AS INDIANS
THE MEN OF THE BOSTON TEA PARTY
DECEMBER 16, 1773
WITH HER CHILDREN SHE WAS SMUGGLED
THROUGH THE LINES TO MALDEN
PASSED LATTER PART OF LIFE HERE
WITH YOUNGEST SON, JOHN NICHOLS DYAR
ON PROSPECT FARM
AND WAS BURIED ON THIS SPOT.

ALSO HER HUSBAND

JOSEPH DYAR

WHO WAS NINE TIMES CAPTURED BY THE BRITISH
WHILE CAPTAIN OF BOAT
CARRYING SUPPLIES TO AMERICAN ARMY
DIED FROM EFFECT OF ILL TREATMENT IN 1783
AND WAS BURIED IN MALDEN, MASS.

THIS GRAVE RESTORED BY THEIR DESCENDANTS,
TOWN OF FREEMAN,
AND COLONEL ASA WHITCOMB CHAPTER
OF KINGFIELD, SEPTEMBER 1923.

TABLET PLACED BY THE MAINE STATE COUNCIL
DAUGHTERS OF THE AMERICAN REVOLUTION
JULY 1924.

References 
 “Elizabeth Dyar History”. Colonial Daughters Chapter, Daughters of the American Revolution. Farmington, Maine. Accessed on June 1, 2021.https://https://www.mainedar.org/chapter/colonialdaughters/dyarbiography.htmll

 Jenney, A Harriet. “The Elizabeth Dyar Chapter". Daughters of the American Revolution Magazine. Vol 23. United States: National Society of the Daughters of the American Revolution, 1903.

 Labaree, Benjamin Woods. The Boston Tea Party. Northeastern classics ed. Northeastern University Press, 1964.

 Norton, Mary Beth. Liberty's Daughters: The Revolutionary Experience of American Women, 1750-1800: with a New Preface. United Kingdom: Cornell University Press, 1996.

 S. Jay Kleinberg, Vicki L. Ruiz, and Eileen Boris. “3. From Daughters of Liberty to Women of the Republic: American Women in the Era of the American Revolution.” In The Practice of U.S. Women’s History : Narratives, Intersections, and Dialogues. Rutgers University Press, 2007.

 “Oldest House in Franklin County.” Sprague's Journal of Maine History; Vol 11. page 33. Androscoggin Historical Society, 1914.

 U.S Congress, Senate.“28th Report of the National Society of the Daughters of the American Revolution”. 69th Congress, 1st session. United States: U.S. Government Printing Office, 1926.

Citations 

1751 births
1818 deaths